"Stars" (2004) is the debut single by Chloë from her album Beyond Coming. The song peaked at #66 in Australia.

Track listing
"Stars" – 4:07
"Stars" (Buchman mix)
"Stars" (acoustic)

Charts

References

2004 singles
Chloë (Australian singer) songs
2004 songs
Sony BMG singles